Anania stachydalis is a species of moth of the family Crambidae. It is found in Europe. The species closely resembles Anania coronata.

The wingspan is 23–25 mm. The forewings are dark fuscous ; lines hardly darker, first indistinct, second forming a very strong curve outwards above middle, and a deep abrupt sinuation inwards below it, preceded by a whitish -yellowish spot in the curve, and interruptedly edged posteriorly with whitish-yellowish on upper half ; orbicular dot and linear discal mark darker, separated by a whitish-yellowish spot. Hindwings as forewings, but pale spots in disc larger and approximated; a pale costal spot before second line. The larva is green, incisions white ; subdorsal line white ; spiracular fine, whitish ; spots green, whitish-ringed ; head whitish.

The moth flies from May to August depending on the location.

The larvae feed on Stachys.

References

External links 

 Anania stachydalis at UKmoths
 Lepidoptera of Belgium
 Lepiforum.de
 waarneming.nl 

Pyraustinae
Moths of Europe
Moths described in 1821
Taxa named by Ernst Friedrich Germar